Ryu Hyun-woo may refer to:

People 

 Ryu Hyun-woo (golfer) (born 1981), South Korean professional golfer
 Ryu Hyun-woo (diplomat), North Korean ambassador to Kuwait